Monardella undulata is an uncommon species of flowering plant in the mint family known by the common name curlyleaf monardella. It is an annual herb and is endemic to the coast of California.

Description
The fleshy, wavy-edged leaves are located in clusters along the stem.

The inflorescence is a head of several flowers blooming in a small cup of rough-haired, sometimes purple-tinged bracts up to 3 centimeters wide. The flowers are purple in color and up to 2 centimeters long.

Subspecies
Subspecies include:
 Monardella undulata ssp. arguelloensis — endemic to Point Arguello in Santa Barbara County.
 Monardella undulata ssp. crispa — endemic to coastal sage scrub habitats of northern Santa Barbara County and southern San Luis Obispo County.
 Monardella undulata ssp. undulata — endemic to coastal sage scrub habitats of northern Santa Barbara and southern San Luis Obispo Counties.

Distribution and habitat
It is endemic to the coast of California from Sonoma to Santa Barbara Counties, where it is known from several coastal habitat types, including dunes, coastal sage scrub, chaparral, and forest.

Conservation
The plant is threatened by forces that degrade its coastline habitat, such as sand mining and competing introduced plant species.

This species is an important food plant for the endangered Myrtle's silverspot butterfly (Speyeria zerene myrtleae), which eats its nectar.

References

External links
 Jepson Manual eFlora (TJM2) treatment of Monardella undulata
 USDA Plants Profile for Monardella undulata
 UC Photos gallery: Monardella undulata

undulata
Endemic flora of California
Natural history of the California chaparral and woodlands
Natural history of the California Coast Ranges
Natural history of San Luis Obispo County, California
Natural history of Santa Barbara County, California
Butterfly food plants
Flora without expected TNC conservation status